Rupesh Shah (born 5 August 1973) is an Indian player of English billiards. He was world professional champion (short format) in 2012.

Biography 
Shah was born on 5 August 1973 in Ahmedabad, India.

He was introduced to English billiards by his brother, and won a club level tournament aged 17. In 1993 he qualified as a representative of Gujarat at the Indian national billiards championship, won both the junior and senior billiards tournaments at the age of 19. The following year, he won the national titles at both billiards and snooker. He won a bronze medal at the 2006 Asian Games as part of the India men's snooker team.

At the 2007 IBSF World Billiards Championship, Shah won through a tough quarter-final against Paprut Chaithanasakul and a semi-final against Kyaw Oo to reach the final. Shah took a 4–1 lead against Ashok Shandilya, but saw his lead reduced to one game, at 5–4, before winning the last game to take the match 6–4. At the 2008 IBSF championship, Shah failed to retain the title, losing 3–5 to Pankaj Advani in the semi-final.

Having turned professional, Shah entered the 2008 World Professional Billiards Championship, but failed to progress from his qualifying group. He lost at the semi-final stage the 2009 World Professional Billiards Championship (long format), having led Mike Russell by 198 before losing by 486.

At the 2011 World Billiards Championship, Shah was again a losing quarter-finalist, this time 455–1,000 to David Causier.

In the 2012 World Professional Billiards Championship (150-up), Shah recorded wins over Mike Russell, 4–2 in the last 16, and Peter Gilchrist, 5–2 in the semi-final, and beat Matthew Bolton 6–2 in the final to win the title. The following year, he lost in the quarter-finals, 3–4 to Robert Hall.

He was part of the winning team at the first World Billiards Team Championship in 2014. At the World Championship (100 up) in 2016, he was a losing semi-finalist. and at the 2017 World Championships for both short format and long format.

Career highlights 
2007 IBSF World Billiards Champion
2012 World Billiards Champion

References 

Indian players of English billiards
World champions in English billiards
1973 births
Living people
Sportspeople from Gujarat
Recipients of the Arjuna Award
Asian Games medalists in cue sports
Asian Games bronze medalists for India
Medalists at the 2006 Asian Games
Cue sports players at the 2006 Asian Games